Oxybasis urbica is a species of flowering plant belonging to the family Amaranthaceae.

Its native range is Europe to Russian Far East and Northern China.

References

Chenopodioideae
Flora of Malta